(born 14 April 2000) is a Japanese table tennis player. She won Women's World Cup in 2016 as the youngest ever winner. She won the women's singles at the 2017 Asian Table Tennis Championships by sweeping away three top Chinese players. She competed at the 2020 Summer Olympics, winning a silver medal in women's team event.

Career

2014
In March 2014, she and Mima Ito won their first doubles title at ITTF World Tour German Open. They became the youngest ever winners of the doubles competition in the ITTF World Tour. She was part of the Japanese team in 2014 Asian Games, but lost to China in the final.

In April 2014 she won her second doubles title with Mima Ito at the ITTF World Tour Spanish open.

In December 2014, she won the doubles title with Mima Ito at the  ITTF World Tour Grand Finals in Bangkok. The pair defeated Singapore pair of Feng Tianwei and Yu Mengyu in the semi-finals and Poland pair of Katarzyna Grzybowska and Natalia Partyka in the final.

2015
On 5 July 2015, Miu Hirano and Mima Ito won the Women's Doubles title at the ITTF World Tour Korean Open. This was their third doubles title since 2014.

2016
In April 2016, she won her first women's singles title in ITTF World Tour Polish Open by defeating Yu Mengyu in the Final.

On 9 October 2016, with the absence of Chinese players, she seized the opportunity to win the Women's World Cup in Philadelphia, USA after defeating Mima Ito in the quarterfinals, Feng Tianwei in the semi-final and Cheng I-ching in the final. This marks the youngest women's World Cup Champion and the first non-Chinese player to win the title.

2017

On 22 January 2017, she won All Japan Championships by defeating Kasumi Ishikawa 4–2 in the final at the Tokyo Metropolitan Gymnasium.
On 14 April 2017, she defeated the world ranked No.1 player Ding Ning at the 2017 ITTF Asian Table Tennis Championships. The following day of the tournament, she defeated the world ranked No.2 player Zhu Yuling in the Semifinals  and Chen Meng world ranked No.5 in the Finals, where she set a new record for the youngest winner of the Asian Championships in the singles event.  She became the third non-Chinese player ever and the first non-Chinese player since Chire Koyama in 1996 to win the singles title.

In the 2017 World Table Tennis Championships in Düsseldorf, Hirano progressed to the singles semi-finals but lost to Ding Ning of China. She obtained a joint bronze medal with Liu Shiwen of China. This ended a long medal drought for Japan in women's singles at the world championships since Toshiko Kowada achieved the gold medal in 1969 World Championships.

2021 
Hirano represented Japan at the 2021 Tokyo Olympics in the team event. However, she will not play in the singles event. In March, Hirano played in WTT Doha, but suffered disappointing upsets in both the WTT Contender and WTT Star Contender event, including a loss to Shin Yubin in a potential Olympic Team preview.

Hirano won silver in the team event at the Tokyo Olympics.

Finals

Singles
4 titles, 5 runners-up

Doubles
8 titles, 9 runners-up

Performance timeline

(W) won; (F) finalist; (SF) semi-finalist; (QF) quarter-finalist; (#R) rounds 4, 3, 2, 1(S) singles event; (D) women's doubles event; (T) team event

Teams
Teams joined in T.League:
 Nissay Red Elf (2018–2022)
 Kinoshita Abyell Kanagawa (2022–)

Awards
2016: ITTF Breakthrough Star of the Year

Records
World Cup Women's singles the youngest Champion
Asian Championship Women's singles the youngest Champion

In popular culture
Hirano made her acting debut in the 2018 Fuji TV drama The Confidence Man JP.

References

External links

 

 
 Miu Hirano - ITTF
 Miu Hirano - ITTF archive
 
 Miu Hiranotabletennis-reference
 Miu HiranoJOC
 Miu Hirano's SponsoringMizuno Japan
 Miu Hirano official support site
 Management companyAthlete Solution

2000 births
Living people
Japanese female table tennis players
Asian Games medalists in table tennis
Table tennis players at the 2014 Asian Games
Asian Games silver medalists for Japan
Medalists at the 2014 Asian Games
People from Numazu, Shizuoka
World Table Tennis Championships medalists
Japanese expatriate sportspeople in China
Table tennis players at the 2018 Summer Youth Olympics
Olympic table tennis players of Japan
Table tennis players at the 2020 Summer Olympics
Medalists at the 2020 Summer Olympics
Olympic medalists in table tennis
Olympic silver medalists for Japan
21st-century Japanese women